Charles Alexander of Württemberg (24 January 1684 – 12 March 1737) was a Württemberg Duke from 1698 who governed the Kingdom of Serbia as regent from 1720 until 1733, when he assumed the position of Duke of Württemberg, which he held until his death.

Early life 
Born in Stuttgart, he was the eldest son of Frederick Charles, Duke of Württemberg-Winnental and his wife, Margravine Eleonore Juliane of Brandenburg-Ansbach.

Biography 
He succeeded his father as Duke of Württemberg-Winnental in 1698. As a successful army-commander in service of the Holy Roman Emperor, he had converted to Roman Catholicism in 1712. He was militarily successful under Prince Eugene of Savoy in the Spanish War of Succession as well as in the Ottoman–Venetian War. In 1719 he was appointed imperial governor of Belgrade.

In 1720 Holy Roman Emperor Charles VI appointed him governor of the Kingdom of Serbia in Belgrade. While in this post he married Princess Marie Auguste of Thurn and Taxis (1706–56) in 1727; they had 4 children.

After 13 years of autocratically ruling over Serbia, in 1733 Charles Alexander inherited the Duchy of Württemberg from his cousin, Eberhard Louis.  As Duke of Württemberg he moved the court back from Ludwigsburg to the nearby capital of Stuttgart.  He ruled over the Duchy until his sudden death in 1737, and was succeeded by his nine-year-old son, Charles Eugene.

During his reign, he employed as his financier the ill-fated Joseph Süss Oppenheimer, who was executed in 1738 for abuse of office during the reign of the duke.

Family
He married Princess Marie Auguste of Thurn and Taxis (1706–1756) in 1727; they had 6 children:
 Charles Eugene, Duke of Württemberg (1728–1793), married Princess Elisabeth Fredericka Sophie of Brandenburg-Bayreuth; no issue.
 Eugen Louis (1729)
 Louis Eugene, Duke of Württemberg (1731–1795), married Countess Sophie Albertine of Beichlingen; had issue.
 Frederick II Eugene, Duke of Württemberg (1732–1797), married Princess Friederike Dorothea of Brandenburg-Schwedt; had issue.
 Alexander Eugen (1733–1734)
 Auguste Elisabeth (1734–1787), married Prince Karl Anselm, 4th Prince of Thurn and Taxis; had issue.

King Charles III is his descendant through his great-grandmother Mary of Teck.

In literature and film 

Although the story of Duke Karl Alexander and Joseph Süß Oppenheimer constituted a relatively obscure episode in German history, it became the subject of a number of literary and dramatic treatments over the course of more than a century; the earliest of these having been Wilhelm Hauff's 1827 novella, titled Jud Süß. The most successful literary adaptation was Lion Feuchtwanger's 1925 novel titled Jud Süß based on a play that he had written in 1916 but subsequently withdrew.

Ashley Dukes and Paul Kornfeld also wrote dramatic adaptations of the Feuchtwanger novel.  In 1934, Lothar Mendes directed "Jew Süss", a film adaptation of the novel. The role of Karl Alexander was played by Frank Vosper.

Charles Alexander and his relationship with Oppenheimer is fictionally portrayed in Veit Harlan's 1940 Nazi propaganda film titled Jud Süß. He is portrayed by Heinrich George.

Although inspired by the historical details of Süß's life, Hauff's novella, Feuchtwanger's novel, and Harlan's film only loosely correspond to the historical sources available at the Landesarchiv Baden-Württemberg.

Ancestors

See also 
Great Turkish War

Notes 

1684 births
1737 deaths
18th-century dukes of Württemberg
18th-century viceregal rulers
Hereditary Princes of Württemberg
Nobility from Stuttgart
Austrian army commanders in the War of the Spanish Succession
Modern child monarchs
Converts to Roman Catholicism from Lutheranism
Generals of the Holy Roman Empire
Austro-Turkish War (1716–1718)
Knights of the Golden Fleece of Austria